

Yankee Doodle Dandy 
Yankee Doodle Dandy (real name John Dandy) is a DC Comics character introduced in January 1992 in Doom Patrol, Vol. 2, #51.  The character was first devised for Showcase by Bob Oksner in 1964 but the art did not appear until 28 years had passed.

This hero's name is based upon the song "Yankee Doodle". He is the second DC character named from the song, the first being Yankee Poodle (aka Earth-C's Rova Barkitt) who was part of the Zoo Crew encountered in New Teen Titans #16 in February 1982.

John at one point steals the formula for "pseudoderm" (used in the Question's mask) from its inventor, Aristotle Rodor.

Yellow Lantern

Yellow Peri

Yellowjacket

Yo-Yo 
Yo-Yo is a name used by two characters in the DC Universe.

Flashpoint Yo-Yo 
The original was a clown-like henchman of the Joker who first appeared during the Flashpoint timeline; she was created by Geoff Johns and Andy Kubert and first appeared in Flashpoint (vol. 2) #1 (2011).

Chang Jie-Ru 
In 2011, The New 52 rebooted the DC universe. Chang Jie-Ru uses the name as a member of the Suicide Squad. He has the ability to increase and decrease his mass. When back at Belle Reve, Yo-Yo is caught up in a supervillain prison riot, tasked alongside Deadshot and El Diablo with quelling the inmate rebellion. He is ordered by Amanda Waller to retrieve King Shark from his holding cell. Yo-Yo uses his ability to slip through the bars, where an otherwise immobile King Shark devours the mass-shifter whole. King Shark lowers his head to stare blankly at Yo-Yo's blood congealing on the cell floor, perhaps feeling regret for what he has done to his fellow team member.

Yo-Yo in other media 
The Flashpoint version of Yo-Yo appears in Justice League: The Flashpoint Paradox, voiced by Hynden Walch.

Young Frankenstein 
Young Frankenstein is a fictional character appearing in American comic books published by DC Comics.

Little is known about the origin of Young Frankenstein. At one point, Young Frankenstein was a member of the Teen Titans in-between the events of Infinite Crisis and One Year Later. A picture of him clearly shows him as a younger version of the famous Frankenstein, another DC Comics character based on the famous monster and a member of the Seven Soldiers of Victory. What the connection is between the two has yet to be explained.

He finally made an appearance during the World War III event where he and the other Teen Titans tried to help stop a rampaging Black Adam. The group confronts the murderer at the Greek Parthenon. Zatara is badly injured. Young Frankenstein grabs Black Adam, who then rips off his arms. At that point the Titans leave their wounded to the care of rapidly approaching Greek authorities. Martian Manhunter, disguised as a medical worker, goes into Young Frankenstein's mind and learns that he is still alive and in great pain. Martian Manhunter soothes his mind, staying with him until his death.

In the DC Infinite Halloween Special, Victor Zsasz revealed the final fate of Young Frankenstein in a tale called "...In Stitches". As his remains were being carried away in a helicopter, it was struck by lightning. His body was blown to bits, and the individual pieces began moving on their own, killing anyone in their path for new flesh. Young Frankenstein was finally able to pull himself back together in Albania and began walking on the bottom of the Ionian Sea with a need for revenge.

According to promotional materials for the new Terror Titans series, Young Frankenstein, whose final story is now revealed to be true and not a fabricated Halloween tale, is stated to be one of the imprisoned heroes forced to fight on the behest of the Apokoliptan gods on Earth in the Dark Side Club. After being rescued from the club by Miss Martian, Young Frankenstein was offered a spot on the new Teen Titans roster, but declined.

He also appears in a pin-up drawn for the final issue of Teen Titans.

Yuda 

Yuda is a fictional goddess in the DC Universe.

The character first appeared in Krypton Chronicles #3.

Yuda is one of the chief deities of ancient Krypton's mythology and pantheon, associated with love and marriage. She also represented the two moons of Krypton and was commonly known as "the Mistress of the Moons". For this reason, when the two moons Mithen and Wegthor came together in the night sky, they were believed to represent marriage.

Her worship ended with the flood, when Jaf-El introduced the monotheistic worship of Rao. Despite of it, she was remembered in folklore and even a mechanical statue of her was used in Superman's home city Kryptonopolis at certain festivities.

Yuda in other media 
A version of Yuda (renamed Yuda Kal) appears in Supergirl, through the human vessel Olivia (portrayed by Sofia Vassilieva). In this depiction, Yuda Kal was a Kryptonian goddess of life and birth worshipped by the Juru, the first people of Krypton, but was soon erased with Rao and the ways of science by modern Krypton, becoming feared as a dark, evil deity. The Kryptonian witches (known as Children of Juru) aimed to revive the ancient religion as a revenge against Rao and put an apocalyptic event of coming darkness on their planet. In tribute to Yuda Kal, the witches made a specific mix of chemicals and magic spells to create the Worldkillers using the Harun-El, a Kryptonian metal with magical properties. The Worldkillers (Reign, Purity and Pestilence) were launched during the final days of Krypton when it exploded, landing on Earth, while their creators escaped the destruction on Argo City, which was separated from its planet (with the exception of Jindah Kol Rozz who was earlier convicted on the prison Fort Rozz and later killed by Reign to protect the Worldkiller's secrets). The witch's aim is to ensure that the dark prophecy is fulfilled, specifically terraforming the planet Earth by Worldkillers to make a New Krypton. This ancient teaching found its way through the religious sect "Cult of Yuda Kal", founded by Thomas Colville, in their belief that Yuda Kal would bring salvation on Earth. After Thomas ended on prison, another member Olivia assumed the leadership. In the season three episode "The Fanatical", using Yuda Kal's recipe documented in Coville's journal, Olivia was able to gain powers through an Harun-El statue of the goddess and briefly turned into a Worldkiller-like vessel with the goal of carrying out Reign's deliverance on Earth, but she is ultimately defeated by Supergirl, stripping her powers and Olivia becoming normal human. The fate of Yuda Kal is unknown, following the disbandment of the Cult, the arrest of all Kryptonian witches and the death of all three Worldkillers.

References 

 DC Comics characters: Y, List of